Aydan Hojjatova (born 6 April 1999) is an Azerbaijani chess player.

Hojjatova began playing chess at an early age.  She earned the FIDE titles Woman Candidate Master (WCM) in 2009, Woman FIDE Master (WFM) in 2015, and Woman Grandmaster (WGM) in 2018.

References

External links 
 
 
 
 Aydan Hojjatova at Chess-DB.com
 FIDE ratings

1999 births
Living people
Place of birth missing (living people)
Azerbaijani female chess players
Chess woman grandmasters